Statistics of Japanese Regional Leagues for the 1982 season.

Champions list

League standings

Hokkaido

Hakodate FC 1976 changed name to Blackpecker Hakodate.

Tohoku

Kanto

Hokushinetsu

Tokai

Kansai

Chūgoku

Shikoku

Kyushu
{{#invoke:sports table|main|style=WDL
|res_col_header=QR
|winpoints=2
|sortable_table=y

|team1=MCK|name_MCK=Mitsubishi Chemical Kurosaki
|team2=KGT|name_KGT=Kagoshima Teachers
|team3=NAK|name_NAK=Nakatsu Club
|team4=NSO|name_NSO=Nippon Steel Oita
|team5=SNC|name_SNC=Saga Nanyo Club
|team6=KMT|name_KMT=Kumamoto Teachers
|team7=MHI|name_MHI=Mitsubishi Heavy Industries Nagasaki
|team8=KSE|name_KSE=Kyocera Sendai
|team9=KAW|name_KAW=Kawasoe Club
|team10=MIY|name_MIY=Miyanoh Club
|win_MCK=5|draw_MCK=2|loss_MCK=2|gf_MCK=24|ga_MCK=10
|win_KGT=5|draw_KGT=2|loss_KGT=2|gf_KGT=22|ga_KGT=11
|win_NAK=5|draw_NAK=2|loss_NAK=2|gf_NAK=23|ga_NAK=13
|win_NSO=4|draw_NSO=3|loss_NSO=2|gf_NSO=23|ga_NSO=10
|win_SNC=5|draw_SNC=1|loss_SNC=3|gf_SNC=18|ga_SNC=10
|win_KMT=5|draw_KMT=1|loss_KMT=3|gf_KMT=20|ga_KMT=17
|win_MHI=4|draw_MHI=1|loss_MHI=4|gf_MHI=21|ga_MHI=20
|win_KSE=2|draw_KSE=2|loss_KSE=5|gf_KSE=15|ga_KSE=31
|win_KAW=1|draw_KAW=2|loss_KAW=6|gf_KAW=9|ga_KAW=28
|win_MIY=1|draw_MIY=0|loss_MIY=8|gf_MIY=12|ga_MIY=37

|status_text_Q=Qualified for the Japan Regional Football Champions League

|col_Q=#ccffcc|text_Q=Qualified for the 6th JSL Promotion Tournament 
|result1=Q
|col_R=#FBAED2|text_R=Relegated
|result10=R

|update=complete|source=

References

1982
Jap
Jap
3